Larry Bales (born August 29, 1947) is a former American football and baseball college coach. He played college football at Emory and Henry College.

Early years
Bales attended Marion Senior High School. As a senior in 1964, he was the starter at quarterback, leading the state of Virginia high school quarterbacks in touchdown passes and receiving All-state honors.

He accepted a football scholarship from Emory and Henry College. As a freshman, he was named the starter at quarterback in the fourth game of the season. As a sophomore, he was converted into a halfback and played in 6 games until suffering a season-ending injury.

As a junior, he was moved to flanker, making 48 receptions, while averaging 70.7 receiving yards per game. 

As a senior, he registered 96 carries for 684 yards (7.13-yard avg.) and 61 receptions for 1,202 yards (school record). He scored 12 receiving touchdowns, 4 rushing touchdowns and one two-point conversion, totalling 98 points. 

He finished his college career with school records in: career receiving yards (2,037), single-season receiving yards (1,202), single-season touchdowns (16) and single-game receiving yards (195). He also practiced baseball.

In 1974, he was inducted into the Emory and Henry Athletics Hall of Fame.

Professional career
Bales was selected by the Dallas Cowboys in the seventh round (180th overall) of the 1969 NFL Draft. He also was tried at cornerback during training camp. He was waived on August 15.

Coaching career
In 1970, Bales began his career as the offensive backs and receivers assistant football coach at Patrick Henry High School. In 1972, he was named the football head coach at Abingdon High School. He served as the football head football coach at Emory and Henry College from 1979 to 1981, compiling a record of 7–22–1. After coaching he worked as an insurance agent for State Farm Insurance.

Head coaching record

College football

References

1947 births
Living people
American football wide receivers
Emory and Henry Wasps baseball coaches
Emory and Henry Wasps baseball players
Emory and Henry Wasps football coaches
Emory and Henry Wasps football players
High school football coaches in Virginia
People from Marion, Virginia
Players of American football from Virginia